75th NBR Awards
December 3, 2003

Best Film: 
 Mystic River 
The 75th National Board of Review Awards, honoring the best in filmmaking in 2003, were given on 3 December 2003.

Top 10 films
Mystic River
The Last Samurai
The Station Agent
21 Grams
House of Sand and Fog
Lost in Translation
Cold Mountain
In America
Seabiscuit
Master and Commander: The Far Side of the World

Top Foreign Films
The Barbarian Invasions
The Best of Youth
Monsieur Ibrahim
Autumn Spring
Man on the Train

Top Five Documentaries
The Fog of War
Capturing the Friedmans
My Architect
Winged Migration
Spellbound

Winners
Best Film: 
Mystic River
Best Foreign Language Film: 
Les invasions barbares (The Barbarian Invasions), Canada/France
Best Actor: 
Sean Penn - 21 Grams and Mystic River
Best Actress: 
Diane Keaton - Something's Gotta Give 
Best Supporting Actor: 
Alec Baldwin - The Cooler 
Best Supporting Actress: 
Patricia Clarkson - Pieces of April and The Station Agent
Best Acting by an Ensemble: 
The Lord of the Rings: The Return of the King (Academy Award for Best Picture)
Breakthrough Performance Actor:
Paul Giamatti - American Splendor
Breakthrough Performance Actress:
Charlize Theron - Monster
Best Director: 
Edward Zwick - The Last Samurai
Outstanding Directorial Debut:
Vadim Perelman - House of Sand and Fog
Best Screenplay (Adapted):
Anthony Minghella - Cold Mountain
Best Screenplay (Original)
Jim Sheridan, Naomi Sheridan and Kirsten Sherdian - In America
Best Documentary Feature: 
The Fog of War  
Best Animated Feature: 
Finding Nemo
Best Film or Mini-Series Made for Cable TV:
Angels in America
Career Achievement Award:
Morgan Freeman
Billy Wilder Award For Excellence In Directing:
Norman Jewison
Special Filmmaking Achievement:
Sofia Coppola, for writing, directing, and producing Lost in Translation
Career Achievement - Music Composition:
Hans Zimmer
Career Achievement - Cinematography:
John Toll
William K. Everson Award For Film History:
Richard LaGravenese and Ted Demme, A Decade Under the Influence
Producers Award:
Gale Anne Hurd
Kathleen Kennedy
Christine Vachon
Freedom Of Expression:
Capturing the Friedmans
Dirty Pretty Things
The Magdalene Sisters
11'9"01 September 11
Special Recognition For Excellence In Filmmaking:
American Splendor
Bend It Like Beckham
The Cooler
Dirty Pretty Things
Girl with a Pearl Earring
Pieces of April
The Secret Lives of Dentists
Shattered Glass
The Statement
Thirteen
Whale Rider

External links
National Board of Review of Motion Pictures :: Awards for 2003

2003
2003 film awards
2003 in American cinema